Timoci is a Fijian masculine given name. Notable people with the name include:

 Timoci Bavadra (1934–1989), Fijian medical doctor and former Prime Minister of Fiji
 Timoci Matanavou (born 1984), Fijian rugby union player
 Timoci Nagusa (born 1987), Fijian rugby union player
 Timoci Naivaluwaqa (1953–2006), Fijian politician
 Timoci Natuva (born 1957), Fijian politician
 Timoci Sauvoli (born 1991), Fijian rugby union player
 Timoci Silatolu, Fijian politician
 Timoci Tavatavanawai (born 1998), Fijian rugby union player
 Timoci Tuivaga (1931–2015), Fijian judge
 Timoci Volavola, Fijian rugby union player